Uma gaita na bossa, also known as Nos caminhos da bossa, is a 1997 album by the Brazilian harmonica player Clayber de Souza. It is collection of the main hits of Bossa nova, Jazz and Blues, such as "Samba de uma nota só" and "Garota de Ipanema". However, all its songs were arranged as a fusion of Samba and Jazz, remembering the period Souza played as bass guitarist, in 1960s.

Track listing

References

1997 albums
Humberto Clayber albums